Classic Hits is the fourth compilation album by Australian pop singer John Paul Young, released in 1988. "Don't Sing That Song" was released as the only single in May 1989.

The album has been re-released numerous times since 1988. The tracks on the 2006 re-release were all digitally remastered at Albert Studios, Sydney, Australia.

Track listing

Charts

Release history

References 

John Paul Young albums
1988 greatest hits albums
Compilation albums by Australian artists
Albums produced by Harry Vanda
Albums produced by George Young (rock musician)
Albert Productions compilation albums